Mohammad Abu Hena (born 1937) is a former Bangladeshi government official who was secretary. He was the seventh Chief Election Commissioner of Bangladesh.

Early life 
Abu Hena was born in 1937 in the village of Bahadurpur, Pangshar, Rajbari. His father's name was Amanat Ali Mallick and his mother's name was Begum Shasunnahar.

Career 
Abu Hena joined the then Pakistan Civil Service (CSP) in 1963. He was appointed as the Chief Election Commissioner on 9 April 1996 and resigned on 8 May 2000 citing health reasons. The Seventh Parliamentary Election of 12 June 1996 was held under his commission.

References 

Chief Election Commissioners of Bangladesh
Bangladeshi civil servants
People from Rajbari District
1937 births
Living people